John Plummer Marcellus (July 26, 1838 – May 29, 1932) was a Canadian politician and rancher from Alberta.

Early life
He was born at Morrisburg, Ontario. Marcellus married his wife Maria Barkley in 1871 at Dunbar, Ontario.

1905 election
Marcellus ran for the Alberta legislature in the 1905 Alberta general election. He won a hotly contested 3-way race in the Pincher Creek electoral district in rural southeast Alberta. He served one term as a backbencher in the Legislative Assembly before retiring in 1909. He died in 1932 at Pincher Creek.

External links
John P. Marcellus Pioneer Profile
Legislative Assembly of Alberta Members Listing

1838 births
1932 deaths
Alberta Liberal Party MLAs